Donald Phillip Verene (born October 24, 1937) is an American philosophy professor and author. He is the Charles Howard Candler Professor of Metaphysics and Moral Philosophy at Emory University.

Early life and education
Donald Verene was born in Galesburg, Illinois. He studied at Knox College in his hometown, receiving his bachelor's degree in 1959. He earned his doctorate in philosophy at Washington University in St. Louis in 1964.

Verene is married to Molly Black Verene. Their son, Chris Verene is a photographer.

Career
Verene is a lecturing academic at Emory University. He was editor of Philosophy and Rhetoric from 1976 to 1987. From 1982 to 1988, he was the Chair of Emory's Department of Philosophy.

Considered a worldwide authority on Giambattista Vico, he leads Emory's Center for Vico Studies and edits New Vico Studies. His wife, Molly Black Verene, serves as Assistant Director of the Center.

He also serves on the Board of Visitors for Ralston College, a start-up liberal arts college in Savannah, Georgia.

Verene was a visiting fellow at Pembroke College, Oxford in 1988. He was a visiting scholar at La Sapienza University of Rome in 1996. He is also a Fellow of the Accademia Nazionale dei Lincei.

Publications
Verene is the author of Vico’s Science of Imagination (Cornell, 1992) and Philosophy and the Return to Self-Knowledge (Yale, 1997).

Other publications written by Verene include:
Vico and Joyce (Cornell 1987)
Hegel’s Recollection: A Study of Images in the Phenomenology of Spirit (SUNY, 1985)
The Art of Humane Education (Cornell, 2002)
The History of Philosophy: A Reader's Guide Including a List of 100 Great Philosophical Works from the Pre-Socratics to the Mid-Twentieth Century (Northwestern, 2008)

References

External links
 
 Vico and Joyce

21st-century American philosophers
1937 births
Living people
Presidents of the Metaphysical Society of America
American historians of philosophy
Washington University in St. Louis alumni
20th-century American philosophers
Giambattista Vico scholars
Knox College (Illinois) alumni
Emory University faculty